Jean-Charles Colas-Roy (born 2 May 1978) is a French politician representing La République En Marche! (LREM) who has been serving as a member of the French National Assembly since the 2017 elections, representing the department of Isère.

Political career
Colas-Roy joined the Socialist Party (PS) following right-wing candidate Jean-Marie Le Pen's qualification for the second round of the 2002 presidential election. He eventually left the PS in 2014.

In parliament, Colas-Roy serves on the Committee on Sustainable Development and Spatial Planning. From 2019 until 2020, he was also a member of the Committee on Legal Affairs. In this capacity, he is in charge of environmental issues within LREM. In addition to his committee assignments, he is part of the French-Spanish Parliamentary Friendship Group.

In September 2018, following the appointment of François de Rugy to the government, Colas-Roy supported the candidacy of Barbara Pompili as president of the National Assembly. When Richard Ferrand was elected instead, he stood as a candidate to succeed him as chairman of the LREM parliamentary group. His candidacy was endorsed by Pompili, among others. In an internal vote, however, he came in sixth out of seven; the position went to Gilles Le Gendre instead.

Political positions 
In October 2020, Colas-Roy publicly opposed the government of Prime Minister Jean Castex when he called for fellow MPs to vote against the reintroduction of neonicotinoid pesticides to fight a disease affecting beetroots.

References

Living people
Deputies of the 15th National Assembly of the French Fifth Republic
La République En Marche! politicians
1978 births